Sarah Forbes can refer to:

 Sarah Forbes (cricketer)
 Sarah Forbes (field hockey)
 Sarah Forbes (lacrosse)
 Sara Forbes Bonetta